26 Squadron SAAF is a disbanded squadron of the South African Air Force. The squadron was based at Takoradi, Gold Coast (now Ghana) on the West Coast of Africa during World War II. They flew Vickers Wellingtons on anti-submarine and convoy escort patrols over the Atlantic. The squadron was seconded to No. 298 Wing RAF.

History
 First formed: 24 August 1942
 Formed at: AFB Swartkop, South Africa
 First Operational: 4 May 1943
 Main Role: Anti-submarine (U-boat) patrols and convoy escort duties, Atlantic
 Main base: Takoradi, Gold Coast (now Ghana), West Africa
 Historic aircraft flown: Vickers Wellington MK X and XI
 Disbanded: 12 June 1945
 War Graves: Takoradi European Public cemetery(Ghana), Du Plantation cemetery(Liberia), Yaba Cemetery (Nigeria)
 Memorials: Bays Hill Memorial(South Africa) Commonwealth Air Forces Memorial(Malta), Umtentweni Memorial(South Africa)

External links
26 Squadron SAAF Web Site (Unofficial)
 A Wellington similar to those flown by SAAF 26 Squadron

References

Squadrons of the South African Air Force
Military units and formations established in 1942
Military units and formations disestablished in 1945